Andreas K. W. Meyer (born 2 June 1958) is a German dramaturge and journalist.

Life 
Meyer was born in Bielefeld. In 1987, he began working as a freelance critic, among others for the Frankfurter Rundschau and various radio stations, primarily for the WDR and the Bayerischer Rundfunk. In radio features, he dealt in particular with the work of Carl Orff and Allan Pettersson, but also wrote in this field about, for example, Gottfried von Einem and Jón Leifs.

From 1993 to 2003, he worked as music dramaturge at the Opernhaus Kiel, initially under the direction of general director Peter Dannenberg, from 1995 as chief music dramaturge, and from 2002 as chief music dramaturge and deputy opera director under opera director Kirsten Harms. From September 2004 to June 2012, he was chief dramaturge at the Deutsche Oper Berlin. At the start of the 2013/2014 season, he took over as opera director at the Theater Bonn.

His particular focus as a dramaturge is the revival of unjustly forgotten works of opera literature, primarily from the early 20th century, which helped the opera Kiel gain considerable national interest during Kirsten Harms' directorship. A cycle of lesser-known works by Franz Schreker and the reinterpretation of Gian Francesco Malipiero's I capricci di Callot, Franco Alfano's Cyrano de Bergerac or Richard Strauss' Die Liebe der Danae are exemplary. – His discoveries for the Deutsche Oper Berlin (Alberto Franchetti's Germania and Alexander von Zemlinsky's Der Traumgörge) initially met with less unanimous approval, with the start of the 2007/2008 season, in which Cassandra by Vittorio Gnecchi and Walter Braunfels' Szenen aus dem Leben der Heiligen Johanna (as a scenic premiere) were put up for discussion, appreciation has increased among audiences and press alike. The Szenen aus dem Leben der Heiligen Johanna was named Rediscovery of the Year in the critics' poll of the magazine Opernwelt in 2008.

In addition to Kirsten Harms, with whom Meyer worked on a large number of productions, Katja Czellnik, Marco Arturo Marelli and Johannes Schaaf should be mentioned as important directors in his work since 1995.

In 2000, he presented his first production on an opera stage (with stage design by Anna Kirschstein) with the linking of Frederick Delius' Fennimore and Gerda and Béla Bartók's Bluebeard's Castle.

For Wilfried Hiller, he wrote the libretto of the opera The Rider on the White Horse after Theodor Storm.

Publications 
 with Christoph Munk (ed.): Richard Wagner: Der Ring des Nibelungen. Kiel 2001, .
 Wie man die Geschichte erzählt. Kiel 2003, .
 (ed.): Siebenjahrbuch. Die Deutsche Oper Berlin von 2004 bis 2011. (On behalf of the Deutsche Oper Berlin). Berlin 2011, .
 The Rider on the White Horse: Zweiundzwanzig Szenen und ein Zwischengesang nach Theodor Storm. (libretto. composer: Wilfried Hiller). Mainz 1998, .

Essays in various publications, including:
 Frederick Delius: Music, Art, and Literature. ed. Lionel Carley. Aldershot 1998, .
 Franz Schreker, Grenzgänge – Grenzklänge [Medienkombination]. Zur Ausstellung „Franz Schreker: Grenzgänge – Grenzklänge“ des Jüdischen Museums der Stadt Wien vom 15. Dezember – 24. April 2004. Inkl. 2 CDs. Editor Michael Haas and Christopher Hailey im Auftrag des Jüdischen Museums. Vienna 2004, .

Several contributions to the Bayerische Staatsoper yearbook, the Allan Pettersson yearbook and the Bertelsmann Concert Guide.

References

External links 
 
 

Dramaturges
1958 births
Living people
Writers from Bielefeld